Ian Stuart Bohen (born September 24, 1976) is an American actor known for his role as Peter Hale in MTV's Teen Wolf and as Ryan in Paramount Network's drama series Yellowstone. Bohen also appeared in a recurring role as Roy Hazelitt in AMC's series Mad Men.

Life and career
Bohen was born and raised in Carmel, California. He began his acting career in 1993, making his debut in Todd Field's AFI Conservatory project, Delivering. He followed this with a turn as "Young Earp" to Kevin Costner's "Wyatt," in Lawrence Kasdan's 1994 Oscar nominated film, Wyatt Earp.

In 1997, Bohen landed the role of Young Hercules in Hercules: The Legendary Journeys. He recurred in flashbacks as the young hero during the series. A spin-off of the popular show was made into a television movie, Young Hercules, with Bohen appearing again as Hercules in his formative years. A children's television series was later commissioned, but Bohen declined to return to the role as he was unwilling to move to New Zealand full-time. Between 1998 and 2001, he appeared in ten episodes of Any Day Now as Johnny O'Brien. He appeared in the first season of Mad Men as beatnik Roy Hazelitt, who fell in love with one of Don Draper's many women, Midge Daniels.

In 2012, Bohen guest-starred in four episodes of Major Crimes as the natural father of supporting character Rusty Beck, Daniel Dunn. 

From 2011 to 2017, Bohen had a recurring role in MTV's Teen Wolf portraying Peter Hale. He appeared in 42 episodes during most of the subsequent seasons until the show's end. Bohen enjoyed the challenge of playing Hale, a morally ambiguous character. He also was proud of Teen Wolf portraying LGBT relationships on television.

In 2016, Bohen was cast in Taylor Sheridan's directorial feature film debut, Wind River. Bohen co-starred in Sicario: Day of the Soldado, the sequel to the 2015 film Sicario, directed by Denis Villeneuve. The film premiered on June 29, 2018. Starting in June 2018, Bohen has portrayed recurring character Ryan, a cowboy wrangler, in the television series Yellowstone.

Bohen appears in Little Women, a modern adaption of Louisa May Alcott's novel of the same name, portraying Freddy Bhaer, a German professor who strikes up a friendship with Jo March. The film was released on September 28, 2018, to coincide with the book's 150th anniversary.

Bohen later recurred in the second season of Superman & Lois as Mitch Anderson.

In September 2021, it was announced that a reunion film for the 2011 Teen Wolf television series had been ordered by Paramount+, with Jeff Davis returning as a screenwriter and executive producer for the film. The majority of the original cast members, including Bohen himself, would reprise their roles. The film was released on January 26, 2023.

Filmography

Film

Television

Music videos

Director

Awards and nominations

References

External links 

1976 births
Living people
20th-century American male actors
21st-century American male actors
Male actors from California
American male child actors
American male film actors
American male television actors
People from Carmel-by-the-Sea, California